Penstemon pinifolius, the pine-leaved penstemon or pine-needle beardtongue,  is a species of flowering plant in the plantain family Plantaginaceae, native to the southwestern USA.

Its natural habitats in the rocky uplands of Arizona and New Mexico are a clue to its preferences in cultivation. Though moderately hardy to  it requires an extremely well-drained, sunny position with some protection from hard frosts in winter.

The species and the cultivar 'Wisley Flame'  have both gained the Royal Horticultural Society's Award of Garden Merit. 'Mersea Yellow' is another notable cultivar, with brilliant lemon-yellow flowers.

References 
 

pinifolius
Flora of Arizona
Flora of New Mexico